Stari Trg is a settlement just east of Višnja Gora in the Municipality of Ivančna Gorica in central Slovenia. The area is part of the historical region of Lower Carniola. The municipality is now included in the Central Slovenia Statistical Region. 

Numerous finds in the area indicate a possible Roman settlement in the area near what was the Roman road leading from Emona to Neviodunum.

References

External links
Stari Trg on Geopedia

Populated places in the Municipality of Ivančna Gorica